Nuptials (Noces) is a collection of 4 lyrical essays by Albert Camus. It is one of his earliest works, and the first dealing with the absurd and suicide. Camus examines religious hope, rejects religions and life after death. Instead, he advocates for living for now. 
The collection contains the following essays:
 Noces à Tipasa
 Le vent à Djémila
 L'été à Alger
 Le désert

Noces à Tipasa is the most known essay. 

L'été à Alger is dedicated to Jacques Heurgon. In it, Camus reflects on life in Algiers during the summer, with the sea and the sun, and how even those living in poverty can feel fulfilled. He concludes with one of his core philosophies: “If there is a sin against life, it consists not so much in despairing as in hoping for another life and in eluding the implacable grandeur of this one.”

References

Essays by Albert Camus